The Etmopteridae are a family of sharks in the order Squaliformes, commonly known as lantern sharks. Their name comes from the presence of light-producing photophores on their bodies. The 45 species are  placed in five genera. Three-quarters of the species are in the genus Etmopterus.

Genera
 Aculeola
 Centroscyllium
 Etmopterus
 †Paraetmopterus
 Trigonognathus

References

 
Shark families
Taxa named by Henry Weed Fowler